Alexander Ramsay Grosert MC (1 January 1889 – 12 September 1952) was a Scottish footballer, who played as a right half in the Scottish League for Hibernian, Aberdeen, Leith Athletic and Dunfermline Athletic.

Personal life 
Grosert served in McCrae's Battalion, the Machine Gun Corps and the Gordon Highlanders of the British Army during the First World War. Grosert was serving as a second lieutenant in the Gordon Highlanders in 1918 when he performed an action which was recognised with the Military Cross:

Grosert was severely gassed and wounded during the war. After his retirement from football, he became an amateur golfer and was also a qualified dentist.

Career statistics

References

1889 births
1952 deaths
Military personnel from Edinburgh
Scottish footballers
Scottish Football League players
British Army personnel of World War I
Royal Scots soldiers
McCrae's Battalion
People from Leith
Association football wing halves
Machine Gun Corps soldiers
Gordon Highlanders officers
Recipients of the Military Cross
Hibernian F.C. players
Aberdeen F.C. players
Dunfermline Athletic F.C. players
Scottish dentists
Amateur golfers
Scottish male golfers
Leith Athletic F.C. players
Newtongrange Star F.C. players
Footballers from Edinburgh
Golfers from Edinburgh
20th-century dentists